The Newcastle Northstars (formally Newcastle North Stars) is an Australian semi-professional ice hockey team from Newcastle, New South Wales. The Northstars are a member of the Australian Ice Hockey League (AIHL), joining as an expansion team in 2002. The team is based at the Hunter Ice Skating Stadium in Warners Bay, a suburb of Lake Macquarie, 15 kilometres south-west of Newcastle. The Northstars are affiliated with the ice hockey club of the same name and have won six Goodall Cups.

History

1977–2001 (Pre-AIHL)

Ice hockey started in the city of Newcastle in 1960 at the old boxing stadium where Marketown is now situated.
Originally the Newcastle Red Wings, the Red Wings were part of national leagues of the time. Due to instability there were several variations of these leagues. The Red Wings became the North Stars in 1978 and were leading the national 'Super League' at the time when the Newcastle ice rink went into liquidation in late 1982.

Some players then retired, while others went on to play for teams in Sydney or join inline hockey teams that started in the 1990s in Newcastle. A Newcastle North Stars in-line hockey team was formed including former members of the defunct Wharf Road team.

In 2000 the Hunter Ice Skating Stadium (a.k.a. HISS) opened at 230 Macquarie Road, Warners Bay. The Lake Macquarie suburb, only 15 km from the city, proved an ideal location for the new rink. The rink opened with former North Stars player/coach Garry Doré as general manager.

A local committee was established and the Newcastle Northstars Ice Hockey Club was registered in 2001. The team mostly consisted of Canadian expatriates along with four talented local-born players contested the New South Wales Senior B championship. The Senior B North Stars went on to win the state Senior B Championship for 2001.

Later in 2001 the Hunter Ice Skating Stadium hosted the Goodall Cup tournament. The Goodall Cup is Australia's senior men's national tournament, contested since 1909. Utilising the experience from running the tournament and gaining assistance from existing AIHL teams, rink general manager Garry Doré began building a team ready for the Australian Ice Hockey League. Canadian expatriate Don Champagne was recruited to be coach, and local hockey enthusiast Peter Lambert was recruited as Team Manager.

2002–2006

The Newcastle Northstars entered the Australian Ice Hockey League (AIHL) as the North Stars in 2002. They were a part of the league's expansion that saw the league double in size from three teams to six. The Northstars joined the league along with the Melbourne Ice and Western Sydney Ice Dogs.

Don Champagne was appointed the inaugural Northstars AIHL head coach while Bill Jones was named foundation captain. Due to a lack of local talent in the first season, the league allowed the Northstars to find players in Sydney and evenly split their roster between locals and imports. Newcastle assembled a roster for 2002 with nine Canadians expats and eight locals.

The 2002 season produced highs and lows for the Novocastrians. Newcastle's first ever match in the AIHL was at home at the Hunter Ice Skating Stadium on 4 May 2002 against the Western Sydney Ice Dogs. The Northstars lost the match 3–7. Newcastle's first AIHL victory and shutout came on 19 May 2002 when they defeated the Canberra Knights 4–0. The Northstars finished the season in fourth place with six wins and ten losses. Canadian forward, Brett Hillier, finished the season as the Northstars top points scorers with 34 points.

In 2003, Newcastle appointed their first coaching director. Former Denmark and Canadian national team coach, Rob Barnes was appointed to the position by the Northstars. Barnes made an immediate impact in Newcastle with the Northstars finishing second in the league table in the 2003 season. The Northstars then won their very first AIHL era trophy in 2003. The Novocastrians defeated the Ice Dogs 4–1 in the AIHL final to claim the Goodall Cup.

The Northstars backed up this success in 2004 by finishing top of the league table having only lost one match all season and claimed the team's first premiership and V.I.P. Cup. Success continued in 2005 and 2006 with the Northstars claiming back-to-back Goodall Cups with victories over rivals Adelaide Avalanche in the final in both seasons.

2007–2016

The decade between 2007 and 2016 saw the Northstars continue their strong position within the league, establishing a winning tradition within the team culture. Newcastle throughout this period of time, claimed league premiers and the H Newman Reid Trophy, four times by finishing top of the league standings in 2009, 2010, 2012 and 2015. The team reached the Goodall Cup final eight times, claiming three Goodall Cups in 2008, 2015 and 2016. The Northstars also found success for the first time in the NSW Wilson Cup, lifting the trophy in 2015. The Northstars set a few team records in 2015 with their highest ever points total in a season (63), highest goals scored in a season (152) and highest goals difference (+69). Canadian import, Geordie Wudrick also set league records for highest points in a season, 91 points at a rate of 3.25 per game and most goals in a season, 44 goals. At the conclusion of the 2016 season, for the time, the team had become the most successful franchise in AIHL history.

2017–present

April 2017, prior to the start of the 2017 season, the team announced a minor change to their name. They changed their name from the North Stars to the Northstars. The re-brand was completed to align to the team with the New South Wales registered club, the Newcastle Northstars Ice Hockey Club.

2017 marked a shift in fortunes for the team. After only missing out on finals twice in the previous fifteen years, the Northstars not only failed to qualify for finals but finished their lowest ever position in the league, seventh. Ten wins from twenty eight matches with a negative twenty seven goal difference did not make for good reading. Head coach, Andrew Petrie, decided to step down from his position at the conclusion of the season.

2018 saw an improvement in the Northstars with thirteen wins in the season and a fifth-place finish under the leadership of stand-in coaching trio, Joey Theriault, Ray Sheffield and Garry Doré. However, it was still not good enough to see them qualify for the finals weekend in Melbourne and for the first time in the team's history they failed to qualify for finals back-to-back.

2019, the Northstars hired a new head coach in former Northstars player, John Kennedy Jnr. This was the American Aussie's first head coaching positioning since retiring as a player. The team recruited well with a number of quality imports joining from overseas. Leading the way for the team in 2019 was Canadian import Sammy Banga who finished third top points scorer in the league with sixty-six points. The Northstars saw great improvement over the previous two seasons under the guidance of John Kennedy. They finished the season runners-up in the league standings and qualified for the finals which were played in Newcastle for the first time in seven years. Unfortunately for the Northstars, they were defeated 2-3 by the Perth Thunder in the semi-finals in front of a boisterous home crowd.

Season-by-season results

1 2003 AIHL season statistics are incomplete. No one source has all the information and the AIHL has not published official statistics on www.theaihl.com.

Championships

Goodall Cup 
 Champions (6): 2003, 2005, 2006, 2008, 2015, 2016
 Runners-Up (7): 2004, 2007, 2009, 2011, 2012, 2013, 2022 

H Newman Reid Trophy (2008-Current)
 Premiers (4): 2009, 2010, 2012, 2015
 Runners-Up (4): 2011, 2013, 2019, 2022

V.I.P. Cup (2004–07)*
 Premiers (1): 2004
 Runners-Up (2): 2003, 2005

Wilson Cup
 Winners (1): 2015
 Runners-Up (1): 2014

Bauer Conference
 Winners (1): 2012

* This list also includes Premierships prior to the first trophy, V.I.P. Cup, for Premiers in 2004.

Players

Current roster
Team roster for the 2022 AIHL season.

Player records

The following are the top five all-time leaders in five different statistical categories: matches played; goals; assists; points; penalty minutes

Staff 
<small>Staff roster for the 2022 AIHL season</small>

Team identity

Rivalries

Sydney Ice Dogs
The Proski Newcastle North Stars' primary rivals are the Sydney Ice Dogs (Formally West Sydney Ice Dogs). The first ever AIHL game for the Proski North Stars was a loss to the Ice Dogs, who joined the league in 2002 along with the North Stars. The two teams have a rich history in the AIHL Finals of facing off in big matches in pursuit of the Goodall Cup. The North Stars defeated the Ice Dogs in the 2003 and 2008 finals to win the Goodall Cup (both by a margin of 4–1). The North Stars lost the Cup to the Ice Dogs in the 2004 final, while also defeating the Ice Dogs in the semi-final in 2005.

Adelaide
Over the years the Northstars developed a healthy competitive rivalry with Adelaide franchises, the Adelaide Avalanche and Adelaide Adrenaline. The Northstars and Adelaide have a knack of facing off in big finals matches with both teams sharing in the winning spoils at different times.

The Northstars and Avalanche met in the Goodall Cup deciders in 2005 and 2006. In 2005, the two teams fought for the regular season title with the Avalanche finishing first but the Northstars used their home crowd advantage in the final to secure a 3–1 victory. In 2006, the Northstars only snuck into the finals by finishing fourth but in the finals the dominated the Melbourne Ice in the semi's before meeting the Avalanche in the final. The Northstars played the perfect match, shutting out Adelaide and securing the cup with a 4–0 victory.

In 2009 the North Stars were defeated by the Adrenaline in overtime in the Goodall Cup final, 3–2 in overtime. In 2010 the Adrenaline knocked out the Northstars in the semi-final, holding off a third period comeback by the Northstars to win 7–6.

CBR Brave

Since the induction of the CBR Brave into the AIHL in 2014, the Northstars have built a heated rivalry with the team from Canberra. The two sides have fought each other for league titles, faced-off in hotly contested finals matches, seen players and coaches switch teams and seen a player's career ended. Both sets of fans have a history of banter with walk out music, placards and clothing being used to ramp up the rivalry.

In the 2015 AIHL semi-finals the two teams met in Melbourne. The Brave took a 3–0 lead thanks to two short-handed goals deep into the second period. The Northstars then kicked into life and fought back to win the match 4-3 thanks to a third period hat trick to league MVP Geordie Wudrick.

The Brave then ‘poached’ Wudrick and Jan Safar for the 2016 season, causing a massive stir around the league. Northstar's head coach, Andrew Petrie, took the issue up with the local media and labelled the Brave disrespectful and a team trying to buy the league title. He also went on to label the city of Canberra a place ‘in the middle of nowhere’.

The four 2016 regular season matches saw the two teams rack up 178 penalty minutes and end Brave import Art Bidlevskii's career. The defenceman was accidentally struck in the throat. The two teams met in the AIHL final with the Northstars triumphing over the Brave 2–1 to clinch their sixth Goodall Cup.

In 2017, Newcastle legend, Rob Starke switched to the Brave to take up the head coaching position following his playing retirement. He took with him another long-time Northstars favourite, Brian Bales.

In 2019, the two teams fought for the H Newman Reid trophy for finishing premiers on top of the regular season table. The Northstars and Brave were one and two for much of the season but in the end the Brave claimed the trophy and the Northstars finished second.

Honoured members

Accolades

The Newcastle Northstars have been recognised by the Newcastle City Council as Newcastle's most outstanding senior sports team on three occasions in 2003, 2004 and 2006. They were also a finalist in 2008.

North Stars goalie Matt Ezzy was voted "Sportsperson of the Year" by the Lake Macquarie City Council for his 2005 season in February 2006, and was a finalist for the same award in 2007. North Stars defenceman and assistant captain Rob Starke was also a finalist for Senior Sportsperson of the year, 2007.

North Stars coach Don Champagne was voted "Sports Official of the Year 2010" at the 2011 Newcastle City Sports Awards.

S.M. Hudson Trophy

The Hudson Trophy is awarded by Ice Hockey Australia for sportsman of the year. It was first awarded in 1964 and is open for nominations by Australian ice hockey organisations and teams. Glenn Foll, who captained the Australian national team between 1990 and 2006, is the only player who has played for the Northstars and won the Hudson Trophy. Foll played for Newcastle during the 2005 AIHL season. He won the award in 2003 while playing for rivals Adelaide Avalanche.

Retired numbers

Throughout the history of the Newcastle Northstars, three jersey numbers have been retired in honour of former club legends. The retired jersey number banners hang on the player's bench side of the Hunter Ice Skating Stadium.

Club award winners

Since 2003, each season the Northstars hold an annual awards night to present that season's team awards. There are six awards given out at the awards nights including most valuable player, best defensive player, most improved player, most dedicated player, Tony Huntley Award for best Australian player and the coach's award.

References: 

Team leaders

Team captains
The Northstars have had five different captains in the team's known history.

References:

Head coaches
The Northstars have had five different head coaches in the team's history. In 2018, the Northstars had no head coach, instead the team chose a new coaching structure of three associate coaches to share the coaching responsibilities. Joey Theriault, Ray Sheffield and Garry Doré took up these roles in 2018.

References:

General managers
The Northstars have had one general manager (GM) in the team's history.

References:

Team managers
The Northstars have had seven different team managers in the team's history.

References:

Coaching directors
The Northstars have had one coaching director in the team's history.

References:

Broadcasting
Current:
 Kayo Sports (2022–present) – Domestic online video broadcasting in Australia as part of the league wide deal struck in the lead up to the 2022 AIHL season to show every AIHL game live.
 Sportradar (2022–present) – International online video broadcasting in North America and Europe as part of a league-wide 3-year deal signed in March 2022 in the lead up to the 2022 AIHL season.

Former:
 Fox Sports (2013 – 2019) – Part of the entire AIHL domestic TV broadcasting deal with Fox Sports to show one game a round, normally on Thursday's at 4:30 pm or after NHL games during NHL season.

Northstars triviaTrivia that relates to the Newcastle Northstars club or current and past players of the Northstars.''

The North Stars set an AIHL record for most goals scored in a game by one team – and also for the greatest winning margin in a game – when they defeated the Canberra Knights by a score of 21–2 at the HISS on 6 August 2006.  Centre Marcel Kars recorded 8 goals and 4 assists in the game.
Goaltender Ken Kozak played for the North Stars in 2002.  He was in goal for the Australian national team when they defeated New Zealand 58–0 in Perth in 1987, a world record score for an international ice hockey game.

References

External links

 Official Website: Newcastle Northstars
 AIHL Website: Australian Ice Hockey League
 IHNSW: Ice Hockey NSW
 IHA: Ice Hockey Australia
 HISS Website: Hunter Ice Skating Stadium

Australian Ice Hockey League teams
Ice hockey teams in Australia
Sport in Newcastle, New South Wales
Sports teams in Newcastle, New South Wales
City of Lake Macquarie
Ice hockey clubs established in 1981
1981 establishments in Australia
Trans-Tasman Champions League